And Close As This is the 15th studio album by Peter Hammill, released on Virgin Records in 1986. Each track is a song played and sung by Hammill solo at a keyboard, with the keyboard parts played in a single take. Two of the songs use a grand piano as the keyboard instrument; for the others, Hammill plays a MIDI master keyboard, using it to trigger a variety of MIDI sound modules, mainly electric piano and organ sounds. Keith Emerson collaborated as composer for the song "Empire of Delight" but did not play on the album.

Track listing 
All songs written by Hammill, except where indicated:

 "Too Many of My Yesterdays" – 4:47
 "Faith" – 4:27
 "Empire of Delight" (Hammill, Keith Emerson) – 4:43
 "Silver" – 5:31
 "Beside the One You Love" – 5:12
 "Other Old Clichés" – 4:07
 "Confidence" – 6:37
 "Sleep Now" – 4:42

Personnel 
 Peter Hammill – vocals, grand piano, MIDI Master keyboard

Technical
 Peter Hammill - recording engineer, mixing (Sofa Sound, Bath)
 Paul Ridout – computers, MIDI
 Arun Chakraverty – original mastering
 Anton Corbijn – photography
 Phil Smee – packaging

References

External links 

 Lyrics on Hammill's Sofa Sound website

Peter Hammill albums
1986 albums
Virgin Records albums